John Dahl (born December 11, 1956) is an American film and television director and writer, best known for his work in the neo-noir genre.

Life and career
John Dahl was born in Billings, Montana, the second of four children (his brother is filmmaker Rick Dahl). Dahl spent his young life in and around Montana all the way up through his college years. His interest in film began at the age of seventeen, when he first saw A Clockwork Orange, as told to Robert K. Elder in an interview for The Film That Changed My Life.

He first attended the Montana State University, and then transferred to Montana State University's School of Film and Photography, where he received a degree in film. While at MSU, Dahl was a student of Bill Pullman. His first feature film at MSU was titled The Death Mutants made for $12,000. While at Montana State he played guitar in the punk rock band "The Pugs". He also met his wife, Beth Friedberg at MSU, and after graduation they both left Montana to attend the AFI Conservatory in Los Angeles. He entered the directors program and she entered the cinematography program.

Dahl started his career as a storyboard artist and assistant director. He continued through the eighties making short films and directing music videos for Kool & the Gang and Joe Satriani. Dahl's first two films were Kill Me Again and Red Rock West. His third feature film was the crime thriller, The Last Seduction starring Linda Fiorentino. Fiorentino's performance in the film, although critically acclaimed, was not eligible to receive an Oscar nomination because it aired on cable television before its theatrical release. The Last Seduction also starred Dahl's former college professor, Bill Pullman.

Filmography

As director

Film

Television

As writer

References

External links

1956 births
American male screenwriters
American storyboard artists
American television directors
Living people
Montana State University alumni
AFI Conservatory alumni
Writers from Billings, Montana
University of Montana alumni
Film directors from Montana
Screenwriters from Montana